Liga Deportiva Universitaria de Portoviejo is a professional football club from the city of Portoviejo, Ecuador. They play in the Serie A, Their rival team is Delfín, against whom they contest the El Clásico Manabita.

Achievements
Serie B
Winner (5): 1972 E1, 1976 E2, 1980 E2, 1992 E1, 2000
Runner-up (6): 1981 E2, 1990 E1, 1991 E1, 1993, 1999, 2008, 2019

Players
As of January 28, 2020.

External links

Official website 

Football clubs in Ecuador
LDU Portoviejo
1969 establishments in Ecuador